Walter Pearl Davis (born September 9, 1954) is an American former professional basketball player. He was a forward/guard for 15 years in the National Basketball Association (NBA), spending the majority of his career with the Phoenix Suns. A six-time NBA All-Star, a two-time All-NBA Second Team member, and the NBA Rookie of the Year. Suns retired his No. 6 jersey.

High school and college career
Born in Pineville, North Carolina, Davis was the youngest of 13 children born between 1937 and 1954. His high school teams at South Mecklenburg High School in Charlotte won three state titles and lost only four games.After his senior year,he prepped at the Sanford School, Hockessin, DE, and made the All-State team in the 1973-74 season.

As a standout college player at the University of North Carolina at Chapel Hill, he was selected to play on the USA men's basketball team coached by UNC's Dean Smith that won the gold medal at the 1976 Summer Olympics.  In his freshman year, Davis hit a buzzer-beating jump shot against Duke at the end of regulation to send the game into overtime. At Chapel Hill, Davis was called "Sweet D" because of his seemingly effortless, smooth style of play and because of his strong defensive play.

NBA career
The Suns selected Davis with the fifth pick of the 1977 NBA draft. He made an immediate impact, playing in 81 games and averaging 24.2 points per game in his first season, which would also be his career-high. He won the 1978 Rookie of the Year Award, and earned second team All-NBA honors. Over his first ten seasons, Davis averaged over 20 points per game six times, and earned trips to six All-Star Games.

On February 25, 1983, Davis set an all-time NBA record when he successfully scored his first 34 points before finally missing a shot.  He made his first 15 field goals and converted four straight free throws before missing a jumper with 55 seconds left in the game.   Larry Costello formerly held the record, having made all of his attempts on his first 32 points for the Syracuse Nationals in 1961.

Over his career, Davis averaged 18.9 points, 3.8 assists and 3.0 rebounds per game. Davis was affectionately known as "The Greyhound" for his speedy style and sleek physical appearance. Suns broadcaster Al McCoy created many alternate nicknames for him, including "The Candyman", and "The Man with the Velvet Touch." Davis is the Suns' all-time leading scorer with 15,666 points.

Davis's later years with the Suns were marred by recurring back problems and an ugly drug scandal. In 1987, he was called on to testify on illegal drug use by other Suns players in exchange for immunity from prosecution. (He had twice entered rehab clinics to deal with cocaine addiction.)

Davis's decline mirrored the short decline of the Suns franchise, and at the expiration of his contract in 1988 at age 33, the team did not seriously attempt to re-sign him, offering a 1-year contract at half his previous salary.

Davis signed a two-year, $1.35 million deal with the Denver Nuggets as an unrestricted free agent. He ended up playing for two years beyond this contract, and was included in a three-team trade in early 1991 that sent him to the Portland Trail Blazers for half a season. Davis finished 479 points shy of 20,000 points in a career. In the summer of 1991, he returned to Denver to close out his playing career.

After basketball
Davis later served as a broadcaster for the Nuggets, and has served as a scout for the Washington Wizards. As time passed, Davis and the Suns repaired their relationship. In 1994, his No. 6 was retired by the Suns, and in 2004 he was enshrined in the team's Ring of Honor.

He is the uncle of UNC men's head coach Hubert Davis, who also played for UNC and in the NBA.

NBA career statistics

Regular season 

|-
| style="text-align:left;"| 
| style="text-align:left;"|Phoenix
| 81 || – || 32.0 || .526 || – || .830 || 6.0 || 3.4 || 1.4 || 0.2 || 24.2
|-
| style="text-align:left;"| 
| style="text-align:left;"|Phoenix
| 79 || – || 30.8 || .561 || – || .831 || 4.7 || 4.3 || 1.9 || 0.3 || 23.6
|-
| style="text-align:left;"| 
| style="text-align:left;"|Phoenix
| 75 || – || 30.8 || .563 || .000 || .819 || 3.6 || 4.5 || 1.5 || 0.3 || 21.5
|-
| style="text-align:left;"| 
| style="text-align:left;"|Phoenix
| 78 || – || 28.0 || .539 || .412 || .836 || 2.6 || 3.9 || 1.2 || 0.2 || 18.0
|-
| style="text-align:left;"| 
| style="text-align:left;"|Phoenix
| 55 || 12 || 21.5 || .523 || .188 || .820 || 1.9 || 2.9 || 0.8 || 0.1 || 14.4
|-
| style="text-align:left;"| 
| style="text-align:left;"|Phoenix
| 80 || 79 || 31.1 || .516 || .304 || .818 || 2.5 || 5.0 || 1.5 || 0.2 || 19.0
|-
| style="text-align:left;"| 
| style="text-align:left;"|Phoenix
| 78 || 70 || 32.6 || .512 || .230 || .863 || 2.6 || 5.5 || 1.4 || 0.2 || 20.0
|-
| style="text-align:left;"| 
| style="text-align:left;"|Phoenix
| 23 || 9 || 24.8 || .450 || .300 || .877 || 1.5 || 4.3 || 0.8 || 0.0 || 15.0
|-
| style="text-align:left;"| 
| style="text-align:left;"|Phoenix
| 70 || 62 || 32.0 || .485 || .237 || .843 || 2.9 || 5.2 || 1.4 || 0.0 || 21.8
|-
| style="text-align:left;"| 
| style="text-align:left;"|Phoenix
| 79 || 79 || 33.5 || .514 || .259 || .862 || 3.1 || 4.6 || 1.2 || 0.1 || 23.6
|-
| style="text-align:left;"| 
| style="text-align:left;"|Phoenix
| 68 || 48 || 28.7 || .473 || .375 || .887 || 2.3 || 4.1 || 1.3 || 0.0 || 17.9
|-
| style="text-align:left;"| 
| style="text-align:left;"|Denver
| 81 || 0 || 22.9 || .498 || .290 || .879 || 1.9 || 2.3 || 0.9 || 0.1 || 15.6
|-
| style="text-align:left;"| 
| style="text-align:left;"|Denver
| 69 || 0 || 23.7 || .481 || .130 || .912 || 2.6 || 2.2 || 0.9 || 0.1 || 17.5
|-
| style="text-align:left;"| 
| style="text-align:left;"|Denver
| 39 || 13 || 26.8 || .474 || .303 || .915 || 3.2 || 2.2 || 1.6 || 0.1 || 18.7
|-
| style="text-align:left;"| 
| style="text-align:left;"|Portland
| 32 || 1 || 13.7 || .446 || .333 || .913 || 1.8 || 1.3 || 0.6 || 0.0 || 6.1
|-
| style="text-align:left;"| 
| style="text-align:left;"|Denver
| 46 || 0 || 16.1 || .459 || .313 || .872 || 1.5 || 1.5 || 0.6 || 0.0 || 9.9
|- class="sortbottom"
| style="text-align:center;" colspan="2"| Career
| 1,033 || 373 || 27.9 || .511 || .272 || .851 || 3.0 || 3.8 || 1.2 || 0.1 || 18.9
|- class="sortbottom"
| style="text-align:center;" colspan="2"| All-Star
| 6 || 1 || 18.2 || .455 || 1.000 || 1.000 || 3.3 || 2.5 || 1.2 || 0.0 || 9.8

Playoffs 

|-
|style="text-align:left;"|1978
|style="text-align:left;"|Phoenix
|2||–||33.0||.475||–||.750||8.5||4.0||1.5||0.0||25.0
|-
|style="text-align:left;"|1979
|style="text-align:left;"|Phoenix
|15||–||32.7||.520||–||.813||4.6||5.3||1.7||0.3||22.1
|-
|style="text-align:left;"|1980
|style="text-align:left;"|Phoenix
|8||–||30.6||.504||.000||.737||2.9||4.4||0.5||0.1||20.8
|-
|style="text-align:left;"|1981
|style="text-align:left;"|Phoenix
|7||–||28.4||.481||.000||.588||2.7||3.1||1.0||0.1||16.0
|-
|style="text-align:left;"|1982
|style="text-align:left;"|Phoenix
|7||–||24.7||.448||.333||.917||3.1||4.3||0.7||0.1||18.1
|-
|style="text-align:left;"|1983
|style="text-align:left;"|Phoenix
|3||–||37.7||.435||.500||.810||5.0||4.3||2.0||1.7||26.0
|-
|style="text-align:left;"|1984
|style="text-align:left;"|Phoenix
|17||–||36.6||.535||.273||.897||2.7||6.4||1.7||0.2||24.9
|-
|style="text-align:left;"|1989
|style="text-align:left;"|Denver
|3||0||31.3||.517||.000||1.000||1.7||1.3||1.0||0.0||25.7
|-
|style="text-align:left;"|1990
|style="text-align:left;"|Denver
|3||0||23.3||.400||.000||1.000||3.0||2.0||0.3||0.0||14.0
|-
|style="text-align:left;"|1991
|style="text-align:left;"|Portland
|13||0||8.5||.396||.000||.833||1.2||0.5||0.3||0.0||3.3
|- class="sortbottom"
| style="text-align:center;" colspan="2"| Career
| 78 || ? || 28.0 || .496 || .192 || .830 || 3.1 || 4.0 || 1.1 || 0.2 || 18.6

See also

List of National Basketball Association franchise career scoring leaders
List of National Basketball Association top rookie scoring averages

References

External links
 Career Stats
 Suns.com: Walter Davis page

1954 births
Living people
African-American basketball players
American men's basketball players
Basketball players at the 1976 Summer Olympics
Basketball players from Charlotte, North Carolina
Denver Nuggets announcers
Denver Nuggets players
Medalists at the 1976 Summer Olympics
National Basketball Association All-Stars
National Basketball Association players with retired numbers
North Carolina Tar Heels men's basketball players
Olympic gold medalists for the United States in basketball
People from Pineville, North Carolina
Phoenix Suns draft picks
Phoenix Suns players
Portland Trail Blazers players
Shooting guards
Small forwards
United States men's national basketball team players
21st-century African-American people
20th-century African-American sportspeople